St John's College Boat Club may refer to:
 St John's College Boat Club (Durham)
 St John's College Boat Club (Oxford)